Umeclidinium bromide/vilanterol, sold under the brand name Anoro Ellipta, among others, is a fixed-dose combination medication for the treatment of chronic obstructive pulmonary disease (COPD). It is administered by inhalation.

The most common side effects include upper respiratory tract infections (nose and throat infection), urinary tract infections (infection of the structures that carry urine), pharyngitis (inflammation of the throat), sinusitis (inflammation of the sinuses), nasopharyngitis (inflammation of the nose and throat), headache, cough, oropharyngeal pain (pain in the mouth and throat), constipation and dry mouth.

In 2020, it was the 254th most commonly prescribed medication in the United States, with more than 1million prescriptions.

References

External links 
 

Beta-adrenergic agonists
Combination drugs
Drugs acting on the respiratory system
Long-acting beta2-adrenergic agonists
Muscarinic antagonists
GSK plc brands